Marcus Calpurnius Bibulus (c. 102 – 48 BC) was a politician of the Roman Republic. He was a conservative and upholder of the established social order who served in several magisterial positions alongside Julius Caesar and conceived a lifelong enmity towards him. In 59 BC he was consul alongside Julius Caesar. Their partnership was contentious to the extent that Caesar arranged for Bibulus to be doused in feces in Rome's main forum on the eve of an important vote. Bibulus withdrew from public politics for the rest of his term.

In 51 to 50 BC, he was governor of Syria, where he was effective but alienated the army by taking too much personal credit for the repulse of the Parthians. In 49, after Caesar's Civil War broke out, Bibulus aligned himself with Pompey and was in charge of the fleet tasked with preventing Caesar from shipping his army across the Adriatic. He failed to do so and subsequently failed to effectively cut off Caesar's supplies. On blockade duty in 48 BC, he fell ill and died.

Early years

Marcus Calpurnius Bibulus was a member of the plebeian Calpurnia gens. His cognomen is not previously attested within the gens so he appears to have been the first of the name to reach curile office, but it is unlikely he was a Novus homo, based on the connections he had. He may have descended from the senatorial Pisonian branch of the Calpurnia gens.

He has been described as "earnest and somewhat plodding". He served as curule aedile alongside Julius Caesar in 65 BC. Two curule aediles were appointed each year and they were responsible for maintenance of public buildings (aedēs) and the regulation of public festivals. They also had powers to enforce public order. Caesar overshadowed Bibulus throughout his year in office, particularly in the provision of the ludi Romani, a religious festival involving multiple ceremonies and secular entertainments. He again served alongside Caesar in 62 BC when both were elected praetors, judicial magisterial positions. Bibulus opposed Caesar at every opportunity. Shortly before they took office, Rome was racked by the Catilinarian conspiracy, an attempt by a number of senior aristocrats to overthrow the Republic. During his term in office, Bibulus was called upon to suppress supporters of the Catiline rebellion among the Paeligni, an Italic confederation from what is now Abruzzo.

Bibulus was firmly in the camp of the self-described boni (good men). The boni were the traditionalist senatorial majority of the Roman Republic, politicians who believed that the role of the Senate was being usurped by the legislative people's assemblies for the benefit of a few power hungry individuals. The boni were against anyone who attempted to use these legislative assemblies to reform the state; which was a major policy of the populist Julius Caesar. Caesar nominated himself to stand for the consular elections of 59 BC, with the support of his powerful allies Gnaeus Pompeius Magnus and Marcus Licinius Crassus. Becoming a consul was considered the highest honour of the Roman Republic. Cato and the rest of the boni feared Caesar to be a radical who would destroy the way of the ancestors, the mores. Bibulus was already implacably opposed to Caesar and was married to Porcia, Cato's daughter. The boni bribed the electors heavily in order to ensure that Bibulus would be Caesar's consular colleague. They succeeded; Bibulus narrowly defeated Caesar's preferred consular candidate, Lucius Lucceius.

Consul
Caesar began his term as consul by "presenting a moderate and carefully reasoned bill" to purchase land in order to discharge and settle Pompey's soldiers who had returned from the east some years previously. The Boni, led by Cato, walked out of the Senate en masse to prevent it being heard. Caesar took the bill to the Centuriate Assembly, largely made up of ex-soldiers. Large numbers of Pompey's veterans came to Rome to participate in the expected vote. Bibulus lost popularity by treating them with aristocratic contempt, telling them that he did not care what they wanted. Bibulus was able to secure the support of three plebeian tribunes to block the passage of the bill. However, Pompey and Crassus publicly supported Caesar's bill, and the opposition to Bibulus was such that the tribunes were unwilling to exercise their veto. Immediately before the vote Bibulus ordered it suspended for religious reasons. Caesar, who was also pontifex maximus, the most significant religious official in Rome, ignored this and continued with the vote. Bibulus and two of his tribunes mounted the steps of the Temple of Castor and Pollux and attempted to denounce the bill. The crowd turned on him and his entourage, breaking his fasces (the symbols of his consulship), pushing him to the ground and pouring feces on him. Getting up, Bibulus uncovered his neck and shouted to the crowd to kill him to end his embarrassment. His fellow senators persuaded him to leave and regroup at a nearby temple, as the assembly proceeded to pass the bill.

The following day, Bibulus entered the Senate where he made a formal complaint about the treatment which he had suffered, and appealed to the Senate to annul the law, but this was not acted upon.  He then resisted swearing an oath to uphold the new law, but was eventually convinced to take the oath. After this humiliation, in March 59 BC, Bibulus stopped attending meetings of the Senate, leaving Caesar with complete control over the consulship. He occasionally issued complaints against Caesar and Pompey, which led to attacks on his house from Caesar and Pompey's supporters. For the rest of the year supporters of the First Triumvirate mocked Bibulus by declaring that the two consuls were really "Julius and Caesar". Bibulus returned the insult by referring to his co-consul as the "Queen of Bithynia," an allusion to Caesar's alleged love affair with the King of Bithynia. He also alleged that Caesar had been involved in the first conspiracy of Catiline. Bibulus spent the remainder of his term sequestered in his house where he claimed he was watching for omens, an act that purported to invalidate all legislation passed that year.

By the middle of his consulship Caesar's popularity began to wane, whilst Bibulus's popularity was, according to Cicero, on the rise, mostly due to his vitriolic attacks on Caesar. Seeking to further cause trouble for Caesar and Pompey, in July he directed that the consular elections for 58 BC were to be postponed until 18October. However, in August Lucius Vettius accused Bibulus and one of the consular candidates for 58 BC, Lucius Cornelius Lentulus Crus, of being involved in a plot to assassinate Pompey. Bibulus responded by declaring that he had warned Pompey of the possibility of an assassination attempt on 13May. Vettius was then murdered the day before Bibulus was to be questioned about his alleged involvement in the plot. Lentulus was unsuccessful when the delayed elections finally took place.  Aulus Gabinius and Lucius Calpurnius Piso Caesoninus won the election.

Bibulus attempted to block Caesar's five-year appointment as governor of the provinces of Cisalpine Gaul and Transalpine Gaul by declaring that no public business could be conducted whilst he observed the sky for omens, but was again rebuffed by Pompey and one of the consul-designates who supported Caesar's appointment. At the end of the year Bibulus emerged from his self-enforced retirement and presented himself before the Senate. He took the traditional oath declaring he had done his duty in his consulship. He was then about to justify his actions as consul when the new tribune of the plebs, Publius Clodius Pulcher, used his veto to prevent Bibulus from speaking further.

Senator and governor
Throughout the 50s Bibulus continued to attack Pompey in the Senate, blaming him for the fighting between Publius Clodius and Titus Annius Milo in 56 BC, to the point that Pompey was convinced that Bibulus was in league with plotters who were intent on assassinating him. He also voted against Pompey being granted permission to go to Egypt in person to restore Ptolemy XII Auletes to his throne. Nevertheless, by the end of the 50s, Pompey had been cynically embraced by the boni, who saw in him a champion to bring down Caesar. In 52 BC as a consular senator Bibulus proposed an unconstitutional and illegal resolution, which the Senate accepted, allowing Pompey to serve as sole consul to deal with the breakdown of order in Rome after the murder of Publius Clodius.

As a result of a law passed by Pompey during his sole consulship, proscribing that governorships could not be held by persons who had served as praetor or consul within five years of leaving office, Bibulus was not appointed to a post-consular governorship until 51 BC. He then became governor of Syria. He severely offended the soldiery in Syria by claiming much of the credit due to their commander Gaius Cassius Longinus, whom he outranked. Two years before Crassus had led the Roman army of the east to a calamitous defeat at Carrhae. Longinus had advised Crassus against his misguided actions and when Crassus was killed had taken command and led the survivors in a successful retreat. He then saved the province of Syria by beating the Parthians at Antioch. For this he became the darling of the army. Bibulus arrived to a situation already stabilising. He sent the Senate a report of his pursuit and mopping up of the Parthians and his reorganisation of Syria's defences. The Senate granted Bibulus a thanksgiving of twenty days. With the Parthian threat still present, Bibulus sent two of his sons to Egypt in 50 BC to demand the recall of Roman soldiers who had settled there, but they were killed by the soldiers, who refused to march. When Cleopatra sent him the murderers to be punished, he returned them saying it was up to the Senate to punish them.

Civil war and death

Completing his governorship, Bibulus returned to the west in 49 BC to find that civil war had erupted between Caesar and Pompey. Aligning himself with Pompey, he was placed in charge of Pompey's fleet in the Adriatic, to ensure that Caesar and his troops could not cross from Brundisium in Italy to Epirus to challenge Pompey's army. Having only assembled half the necessary ships, Caesar decided to take seven legions across the Adriatic, and to have the ships return and transport the remaining legions once they arrived at Brindisi. Transporting seven legions across the Adriatic Sea to Greece would ordinarily be difficult due to the winter season.  But because Caesar knew that the calendar was out of step with the astronomical seasons due to his responsibilities as pontifex maximus, he had the advantage of knowing the crossing would be easier than expected. This assisted Caesar to an extent as the Adriatic was sufficiently treacherous to deter Bibulus' war galleys from venturing far from their base at Corfu.

Bibulus was caught by surprise when on the evening of 6November Caesar and his fleet successfully crossed the Adriatic, landing at Palaeste. When he heard of Caesar's crossing, he ordered his crews to return to their ships, and sailed northward, hoping to capture the ships carrying Caesar's reinforcements. Again too slow, he only managed to arrive for their return journey to Italy, capturing and burning 30 of Caesar's transports. He then maneuvered to prevent any further ships crossing to reinforce or supply Caesar. He only captured one transport, which had been chartered by some private individuals and had refused to obey Bibulus's orders. Enraged, he ordered the entire crew killed.

Bibulus then blockaded all the harbors along the coast, hoping to prevent any further crossings from Italy, and leaving Caesar stranded in Epirus. He found that he could not resupply his ships without abandoning the blockade, and so he attempted to bluff Caesar's legates at Oricum into persuading Caesar to agree to a temporary truce so that he could resupply. When Bibulus refused to guarantee the safety of the envoys Caesar wished to send to discuss a peaceful settlement with Pompey, Caesar realised it was a ploy and pulled out of negotiations. Determined to continue with the blockade, Bibulus pushed himself too hard; he fell ill in early 48 BC and died near Corcyra before the end of winter.

Family
Bibulus was the son of Gaius Calpurnius. Bibulus married twice. From his first marriage he had three sons, including the later statesman Lucius Calpurnius Bibulus. His two eldest sons Marcus and Gaius were killed in Egypt by soldiers whom Aulus Gabinius had left there after restoring Ptolemy Auletes to the throne. He may have had a daughter called Calpurnia, who was the first wife of Roman senator Marcus Valerius Messalla Corvinus. His second wife was Cato's daughter Porcia, whom he married sometime between 58 and 53 BC, by her he had two more children, at least one of them a son who lived to adulthood. The other may have been a daughter but it is not certain. After Bibulus' death Porcia married Brutus, who was to be a ringleader of Caesar's assassins.

Notes

References

Sources

Ancient
 Appian, Civil Wars
 Plutarch, Life of Cato the Younger
 Suetonius, Life of Julius Caesar

Modern
 Bringmann, Klaus, A History of the Roman Republic (2007) Cambridge, UK ; Malden, MA: Polity OCLC 318972410
 Broughton, T. Robert S., The Magistrates of the Roman Republic, Vol II (1952) New York : American Philological Association. OCLC 868514975
 Holland, Tom, Rubicon: The Triumph and Tragedy of the Roman Republic (2004) London: Abacus. 
 Holmes, T. Rice, The Roman Republic and the Founder of the Empire, Vol. I (1923) Cambridge: The Clarendon Press. OCLC 2845034
 Holmes, T. Rice, The Roman Republic and the Founder of the Empire, Vol. II (1923) Cambridge: The Clarendon Press. OCLC 163400823
 Holmes, T. Rice, The Roman Republic and the Founder of the Empire, Vol. III (1923) Cambridge: The Clarendon Press. OCLC 889250448
 Morrell, Kit, Pompey, Cato, and the Governance of the Roman Empire (2017)  Oxford: Oxford University Press. 
 Smith, William, Dictionary of Greek and Roman Biography and Mythology, Vol I (1867). London: J. Murray. OCLC 490058450
 Syme, Ronald, The Roman Revolution (1939) Oxford: Clarendon OCLC 185188894

100s BC births
48 BC deaths
1st-century BC Roman governors of Syria
1st-century BC Roman consuls
Ancient Roman admirals
Ancient Roman generals
Bibulus, Marcus
Curule aediles
Optimates
Roman Republican praetors
Year of birth uncertain
102 BC births